The Entertainments National Service Association (ENSA) was an organisation that provided entertainment for British armed forces personnel during World War II. 

ENSA may also refer to:

 ENSA (gene)
 École Nationale des Sciences Appliquées d'Oujda, an engineering school in Morocco
 European Neutron Scattering Association, a contributor to the International Reactor Innovative and Secure design project
 Svea Airport (ICAO airport code: ENSA) in Norway
 ENSA – Seguros de Angola

See also
Enza (disambiguation)